Suburban Madness is an American crime drama television film, based on a true story of the Murder of David Lynn Harris, starring Sela Ward as PI Bobbi Bacha of Blue Moon Investigations. It aired on CBS on October 3, 2004.

Plot
Suburban Madness is very loosely based on the true story of 44-year-old Clara Harris, a successful Texas dentist and mother of young twins, who hired private investigator Bobbi Bacha, played by actress Sela Ward, to spy on her philandering orthodontist husband.  
Bobbi discovered that her husband is cheating with a new secretary at the dentist office, Lisa, who is recently separated from her husband. Lisa, who is noticeably much more attractive than Clara has no trouble capturing all of David's attention. The two fall in love. After hearing from Bobbi about her husband's cheating, Clara tries to become more appealing to David, but to no avail. In the end, David and Lisa have one final affair at a posh hotel, the hotel where Clara and David got married no less. It ends with Clara, also accompanied by her stepdaughter and David's biological daughter, bursting in and attacking Lisa and David tells her that it's over once and for all and both women leave the hotel in tears. As David walks Lisa out of the hotel, he is run over by his once loving wife.

Reception
The film received fairly negative reaction in Texas due to its loose interpretation of some facts, somewhat inaccurate and stereotypical representation of the people and the area, and use of a Canadian filming location in the northern rockies that bears almost no resemblance to the real subtropical coastal communities of Friendswood and Clear Lake City, Texas.

External links 
 
 

2004 television films
2004 films
2004 crime drama films
American crime drama films
American television films
Films set in Texas
Crime films based on actual events
Films directed by Robert Dornhelm
2000s English-language films
2000s American films